The Beach Girls is a 1982 American sex comedy film directed by Pat Townsend. It stars Jeana Tomasino, Val Kline and Debra Blee.

Plot
Two college girls, Ducky and Ginger, meet their naive friend, Sarah, at a Southern California beach house. The house belongs to Sarah's uncle and to their luck has allowed them to use his house for the summer while he is gone. Soon after Ducky and Ginger arrive, the two plan the first of many wild parties, but not without some resistance from Sarah. The two continue the plans for more partying including inviting assorted misfits, delivery persons, and people just passing by. Eventually, Sarah's resistance fades and she joins in on the wild parties.Cosford, Bill (2 June 1982). 'Beach Girls' no fun to be around, Miami Herald, p. 4B (paywall)

Main cast
 Jeana Tomasino as Ducky
 Debra Blee as Sarah
 Val Kline as Ginger
 James Daughton as Scott Daniels
 Adam Roarke as Carl Purdue
 Herb Braha as Captain Blye
 Bert Rosario as Gardener
 Dan Barrows as Mr. Brinker
 Mary Jo Catlett as Mrs. Brinker
 Fern Fitzgerald as Julie
 Tessa Richarde as Doreen
 Judson Vaughn as Lt.Gower

Reception
Though most reviews took easy pot shots at this low-brow comedy fare, Linda Gross wrote in The Los Angeles Times that the film is a "cheery, unpretentious, youth exploitation midsummer's sex fantasy with excellent production values."  Among other reviews, one stated, "frankly, the film's only saleable attractions are those of the leading actresses--and I would certainly hesitate to call them actresses.  In summary, The Beach Girls attacks the senses like a beached whale that's been deteriorating in the sun for 24 hours."  Another review noted that "for all the nudity, prancing bodies, and overtures to hedonism, there is surprisingly little outright sex in the film."Kelley, Bill (2 June 1982). 'Beach Girls' mindlessly dull despite pretense of hedonism, Fort Lauderdale News, p. 6D (paywall)  The Kansas City Star said the movie "enjoys the dubious distinction of being a worse comedy than Porky's, a feat this reviewer considered virtual impossible."

The film had an eight week production schedule.  The Hollywood Reporter stated in July 1982 that the movie had grossed over $12 million.The Beach Girls, AFI Catalog, Retrieved 6 September 2022

See also
 List of American films of 1982

References

External links

1982 films
1980s female buddy films
1980s coming-of-age comedy films
1980s sex comedy films
American coming-of-age comedy films
American female buddy films
American sex comedy films
American buddy comedy films
1980s English-language films
American films about cannabis
Films about virginity
Films directed by Bud Townsend
Films set in California
Films set on beaches
Beach party films
Teen sex comedy films
1982 comedy films
1980s American films